Last Orders is a four-piece folk band originating from Newcastle upon Tyne and Cumbria. The four members of the band met when they were all members of Folkestra, a youth folk ensemble at the Sage Gateshead.

The band consists of Joe O'Connor, David Jones, Matthew Jones and Kevin Lees.

Last Orders won the BBC Radio 2 Young Folk Award 2007 on 1 December 2006.  As part of their prize, the band performed at the 2007 Cropredy Festival, Towersey Village Festival and Cambridge Folk Festival.

Last Orders released their self-titled debut album with Fellside Records on 30 July 2007.

Discography 
 Last Orders

References

External links 
 Last Orders on Myspace
 Last Orders at Fellside Records

Musical groups established in 2006
English folk musical groups